Eleodes eschscholtzii is a species of desert stink beetle in the family Tenebrionidae.

Subspecies
These subspecies belong to the species Eleodes eschscholtzii:
 Eleodes eschscholtzii eschscholtzii
 Eleodes eschscholtzii lucae

References

Further reading

External links

 

Tenebrionidae
Beetles described in 1848